Fluroxene (INN, USAN; brand name Fluoromar), or 2,2,2-trifluoroethyl vinyl ether, is a volatile, inhalational anesthetic, and was the first halogenated hydrocarbon anesthetic to be introduced. It was synthesized in 1951, and was introduced for clinical use in 1954, but was voluntarily withdrawn from the market in 1974 due to its potential flammability and accumulating evidence that it could cause organ toxicity. In any case, prior to being discontinued, it had largely been superseded by halothane.  Fluroxene is metabolized to 2,2,2-trifluoroethanol, a compound responsible for some of the toxicity seen with fluroxene use.

See also 
 Divinyl ether

References 

General anesthetics
Ethers
GABAA receptor positive allosteric modulators
Trifluoromethyl compounds
Vinyl compounds